Tanzania Cigarette Company Ltd. ("TCC"; DSE: TCC) is a tobacco company operating in Tanzania. The company started operations in 1961 as the East African Tobacco. Years later the government bought a large stake in the company and nationalized the company during the Ujamaa movement in 1975.

TCC has been listed on the Dar es Salaam Stock Exchange since 16 November 2000. 75% of the company is owned by Japan Tobacco International.

History

Incorporation
The Company was established as East African Tobacco in 1961. The factory was officially opened by Mwalimu Julius K. Nyerere on December 4, 1961. The Company now British American Tobacco (BAT) operated the company post-independence. In 1967, the government of Tanzania acquired a 60% stake in the company. During the socialist movement in Tanzania, in 1975 the government acquired the renaming 40% of the stake from the company and becomes the sole owner of the company. The company is renamed to Tanzania Cigarette Company ltd.

Privatization
After years of poor operation and management, the government sells 51% of its stake in the company to RJ Reynolds in 1995. As part of its purchase of some of the assets of RJ Reynolds in 1999, Japan Tobacco Inc. (JT) acquired a 51% interest in TCC. In September 2000, JT purchased an additional 24% of the shares through its international tobacco division, Japan Tobacco International (JTI), increasing its holdings to 75% of the shares.

Public offering
Months after the acquisition of TCC by Japan Tobacco International, TCC was listed on the Dar Brouse with JTI still holding a 75% majority stake.

Corporate affairs
TCC is the only producer of cigarettes in the country. In 2011 TCC brands conquer 90% of the Tanzanian market, while 5% is controlled by British American Tobacco whose factory is in neighboring Kenya, and 5% by foreign brands.

Ownership
Tanzania Cigarette Company (TCC:DSE) is traded on the Stock Exchange since November 2000. Japan Tobacco International has held majority stake of 75% since September 2000. the stock of TCC is owned by the following institutions:

Business trends
Below are the recent business trends for TCC. TCC financial year ends on 31 December.

Brands
Embassy - Registered in January, 1948 in Tanganyika in the name of Brit-Am Tobacco (Tanzania) Limited.
Sweet Menthol (SM) - Launched in 1961 during incorporation.
Portsman - Formerly Sportsman
Club - Launched in 1998
Safari - Launched in 2005
Camel - Originally the American brand introduced in Tanzania by TCC.
Iceberg - Premium Menthol cigarette launched in 2008

See also
 Dar es Salaam Stock Exchange
 Japan Tobacco International
 British American Tobacco

References

External links 

Manufacturing companies of Tanzania
Economy of Dar es Salaam
Manufacturing companies established in 1961
Companies listed on the Dar es Salaam Stock Exchange
1995 mergers and acquisitions
1999 mergers and acquisitions
1961 establishments in Tanganyika